Donau Arena is an arena in Regensburg, Germany. The arena opened in 2001 and holds 4,936 people.

It is primarily used for ice hockey.

Bob Dylan performed at the arena during his 2000 European Tour on May 25, 2000.
P!nk Performed at the arena on March 5, 2009 during her Funhouse Tour.

External links 
 

Indoor arenas in Germany
Indoor ice hockey venues in Germany
Sport in Regensburg
Buildings and structures in Regensburg
Sports venues in Bavaria